Adrian Bodmer (born 6 March 1995) is an inactive Swiss tennis player.

Bodmer has a career high ATP singles ranking of World No. 455 achieved on 7 May 2018. He also has a career high ATP doubles ranking of World No. 292 achieved on 9 April 2018.
Bodmer has reached three career singles finals, with a record of 2 wins and 1 loss. Additionally, he has reached 19 career doubles finals, with a record of 9 wins and 10 losses.

Career
He made his ATP Tour main draw debut at the 2018 Swiss Open where he, alongside compatriot Jakub Paul, was given a wildcard entry into the doubles draw. A fortunate draw saw them matched up again another Swiss-paired wildcard entry in Marc-Andrea Hüsler and Luca Margaroli in the first round, and they took advantage of the opportunity by defeating them in straight sets 6–4, 6–4. They were defeated in the second round by top seeded Dutch duo Robin Haase and Matwe Middelkoop in straight sets 4–6, 2–6.

Bodmer represents Switzerland at the Davis Cup, where he has a W/L record of 0–1.

ATP Challenger and ITF Futures finals

Singles: 3 (2–1)

Doubles: 19 (9–10)

External links

1995 births
Living people
Swiss male tennis players
People from Wil
Sportspeople from the canton of St. Gallen
21st-century Swiss people